The Pannonia Valeria or simply Valeria, also known as Pannonia Ripensis, was one of the provinces of the Roman Empire. It was formed in the year 296, during the reign of emperor Diocletian, in a division of Pannonia Inferior. The capital of the province was Sopianae (today Pécs). Pannonia Valeria included parts of present-day Hungary and Croatia.

The province continued as an entity under the rule of the Huns until the rise of the Kingdom of the Ostrogoths in the 5th century.

It then became the central Avar realm then part of the Avar March, later grew into the Lower Pannonian Principality regaining Pannonia Secunda before being conquered by the Magyars.

See also
Pannonia
Roman provinces
Roman Empire

Literature

External links

Late Roman provinces
Croatia in the Roman era
Illyricum (Roman province)
Valeria
Pannonia Inferior
States and territories established in the 290s
296 establishments
5th-century disestablishments in the Roman Empire
States and territories disestablished in the 5th century